William Leadenham (fl. 1421) was an English politician.

He was a Member (MP) of the Parliament of England for Lincoln in December 1421.

References

Year of birth missing
15th-century deaths
English MPs December 1421
People from Lincoln, England